The 1997-98 West Coast Hockey League season was the third season of the West Coast Hockey League, a North American minor professional league. Nine teams participated in the regular season, and the San Diego Gulls were the league champions. In addition to league play, WCHL teams played regular season games against the Russian Superleague team CKA-Amur (now Amur Khabarovsk).

Four new teams joined the WCHL as of the 1997–98 season, nearly doubling the league's size: the Tacoma Sabercats, Idaho Steelheads, Phoenix Mustangs and Tucson Gila Monsters. From this expansion, as of 2014 only the Idaho Steelheads remain operational as an ECHL team.

Regular season

Taylor Cup-Playoffs

External links
 Season 1997/98 on hockeydb.com

West Coast Hockey League seasons
WCHL
1997–98 in Russian ice hockey
Amur Khabarovsk